Solamente nero (Only Blackness), internationally released as The Bloodstained Shadow, is a 1978 Italian giallo film co-written and directed by Antonio Bido. The film was referred to as "a fine example of a competent giallo, as it contains all of the requisite elements". Paul Simpson wrote about the film: "The pacing goes awry, but Bido uses the unusual setting well and the murders are memorably gory."

Plot
A mysterious stranger strangles a young girl in a field, and the murder goes unsolved. Years later, young Stefano (a college professor) returns home to Venice to visit his brother Don Paolo, a priest who has been ranting against the immoral people in his village...a group of ne'er-do-wells including a gambler, a pedophile/ Count, a fake medium, and an illegal abortionist. One by one, the sinners begin to get murdered, and Stefano tries to uncover the killer before he and his brother become victims themselves. The killer's identity is linked to a child-like painting.

Cast 
 Lino Capolicchio: Stefano D'Arcangelo
 Stefania Casini: Sandra Sellani
 Craig Hill: Don Paolo
 Massimo Serato: Count Mariani
 Juliette Mayniel: Miss Nardi
 Laura Nucci: Sandra's Mother-in-law
 Attilio Duse: Gasparre, the sacristan
 Gianfranco Bullo: Nardi's son
 Luigi Casellato: Signor Andreani
 Alfredo Zammi: Police Commissioner

References

External links

1978 films
Giallo films
1970s crime thriller films
Films directed by Antonio Bido
Films scored by Stelvio Cipriani
Films scored by Goblin (band)
1970s Italian-language films
1970s Italian films